Portugal competed at the 1988 Summer Paralympics in Seoul, South Korea. 13 competitors from Portugal won 14 medals including 3 gold, 5 silver and 6 bronze and finished 28th in the medal table.

See also 
 Portugal at the Paralympics
 Portugal at the 1988 Summer Olympics

References 

Nations at the 1988 Summer Paralympics
1988
1988 in Portuguese sport